Didier Flament (born 4 January 1951) is a French fencer. He won a gold medal in the team foil event at the 1980 Summer Olympics and a bronze in the same event at the 1976 Summer Olympics.

References

External links
 

1951 births
Living people
French male foil fencers
Olympic fencers of France
Fencers at the 1976 Summer Olympics
Fencers at the 1980 Summer Olympics
Olympic gold medalists for France
Olympic bronze medalists for France
Olympic medalists in fencing
Sportspeople from Tourcoing
Medalists at the 1976 Summer Olympics
Medalists at the 1980 Summer Olympics
20th-century French people
21st-century French people